Chaetodipterus is a genus of spadefishes.

Species
There are currently three recognized species in this genus:
Chaetodipterus faber (Broussonet, 1782) (Atlantic spadefish)
Chaetodipterus lippei Steindachner, 1895 (West African spadefish)
Chaetodipterus zonatus (Girard, 1858) (Pacific spadefish)

References

 
Ephippidae
Marine fish genera
Taxa named by Bernard Germain de Lacépède